Christian Lopez (born 15 March 1953) is a French former professional footballer who played as a defender.

Club career
Lopez was born in Aïn Témouchent, French Algeria. In a 15-year professional career, he amassed Ligue 1 totals of 429 games and 28 goals in representation of AS Saint-Étienne and Toulouse FC. He won seven major titles during his spell with the former club – including two doubles– and shared teams with legendary Michel Platini in his final three seasons.

Lopez spent the 1985–86 campaign in Ligue 2 with Montpellier HSC, retiring at the age of 34 after a spell in amateur football with UMS Montélimar. He later worked simultaneously as sporting director and assistant coach for Championnat National 3 side ES Cannet Rocheville.

International career
Over seven years, Lopez earned 39 caps for the France national team and scored once. He made his debut on 26 March 1975, in a friendly against Hungary (2–0 win in Paris).

Lopez was part of the squads that appeared in the 1978 and 1982 FIFA World Cups. He featured in four matches for the Bleus in the latter tournament, with the country finishing in fourth position.

Honours
Saint-Étienne
Division 1: 1973–74, 1974–75, 1975–76, 1980–81
Coupe de France: 1973–74, 1974–75, 1976–77; runner-up: 1980–81, 1981–82
European Cup runner-up: 1975–76

References

External links

1953 births
Living people
People from Aïn Témouchent
French people of Spanish descent
Pieds-Noirs
French footballers
Association football defenders
Ligue 1 players
Ligue 2 players
AS Saint-Étienne players
Toulouse FC players
Montpellier HSC players
France international footballers
1978 FIFA World Cup players
1982 FIFA World Cup players
French football managers
AS Cannes managers